Yucca carnerosana, commonly known as the giant Spanish dagger, is a species of North American plant in the asparagus family that grows in arid and desert climate areas. In the United States, it is confined to only a few counties in western Texas, where endemic populations are found in rocky outcrops. The species is, however, widely distributed in northern Mexico (Coahuila, Durango, Zacatecas, Nuevo León). It has a wide range and is abundant, and although it has local threats, its population appears to be stable overall.

This yucca is cultivated in a few areas such as the western United States, along the lower Pacific and Atlantic coasts of the United States, in parts of southern Europe, as well as other locations.

Yucca carnerosana is branched and arborescent, up to 20 feet tall, with snowy white flowers.

References

External links
photo of herbaruim specimen at Missouri Botanical Garden, collected in Nuevo León, Mexico, Yucca carnerosana

carnerosana
Flora of Texas
Flora of Northeastern Mexico
Plants described in 1938